Several space objects and features have been named after Czech people or things in Czechia. These include planetary features on Mars and Venus, asteroids and exoplanets.

Moon 
 Anděl (crater)
 Bečvář (crater)
 Biela (crater)
 C. Mayer (crater)
 Freud (crater)
 Hagecius (crater)
 Heinrich (crater)
 Heyrovsky (crater)
 Littrow (crater)
 Oppolzer (crater)
 Palisa (crater)
 Rheita (crater)
 Weinek (crater)

Mars 
 Cheb crater
 Tábor crater

Venus 
 Cori crater
 Hanka crater
 Julie crater
 Němcová crater
 Vlasta crater

Asteroids
 7796 Járacimrman

951 Gaspra 
 Carlsbad crater
 Mariánské Lázně crater

Exoplanets 
 Makropulos

External links 
 http://www.ian.cz/detart_fr.php?id=1334

Space program of the Czech Republic
Astronomical nomenclature by nation